Edward Francis Blewitt (January 2, 1859  May 26, 1926) was an American civil engineer, businessman, and politician who served as a Democratic member of the Pennsylvania State Senate for the 22nd district from 1907 to 1910. He was a maternal great-grandfather of Joe Biden, the 46th and current president of the United States.

Early life and education 
Blewitt was born in New Orleans, Louisiana, to Patrick and Catherine (Scanlon) Blewitt, who were emigrants from Ballina, County Mayo, Ireland. Blewitt attended Lafayette College, serving as class president, and earned a Bachelor of Science degree in civil engineering in 1879.

Career
Blewitt worked as an engineer in Lehigh Valley, Pennsylvania mining operations. He worked as the City Engineer of Scranton, Pennsylvania, and as chief engineer of the Guadalajara, Mexico sewer and water system from 1883 to 1893. In 1883, he was elected to one term as school controller of Scranton ending in 1884. He worked as state engineer of the State of Jalisco, Mexico from 1900 to 1901.

In 1906, Blewitt was elected as a member of the Pennsylvania Senate for the 22nd district from 1907 to 1910. Blewitt was the first Irish-Catholic to serve in the Pennsylvania General Assembly.

In 1903, he founded the Edward F. Gold Mining Company, a silver and gold mining operation in Montana.

Blewitt was the co-founder of the Friendly Sons of St. Patrick in Scranton in 1908 and was a member of the Benevolent and Protective Order of Elks.

Personal life 
He married Mary Ellen Stanton in 1879. They had four children together: Gertrude, Patrick, Arthur, and Geraldine. From this marriage (through their daughter Geraldine), Blewitt is the matrilineal great-grandfather of Joe Biden, the 46th president of the United States. His wife died in 1887, and in 1891 Blewitt was remarried to Mary Ann Blackwell.

Blewitt died on May 26, 1926, and was interred at St. Catherine's Cemetery in Moscow, Pennsylvania.

See also 
 Family of Joe Biden

References

External links

1859 births
1926 deaths
19th-century American businesspeople
19th-century American engineers
20th-century American businesspeople
20th-century American engineers
20th-century American politicians
American civil engineers
American company founders
American people of Irish descent
Burials in Pennsylvania
Engineers from Pennsylvania
Biden family
Lafayette College alumni
Democratic Party Pennsylvania state senators
People from Scranton, Pennsylvania
Politicians from New Orleans
Members of the Benevolent and Protective Order of Elks